is a Japanese motorcycle racer. He competes in the British Superbike Championship on a factory-supported Honda Fireblade. Previously racing in the MFJ All Japan Road Race JSB1000 Championship, aboard a Honda CBR1000RR, he was the All Japan J-GP3 champion in 2015, and the All Japan J-GP2 champion in 2017.

Career statistics

Asia Talent Cup

Races by year
(key) (Races in bold indicate pole position; races in italics indicate fastest lap)

Grand Prix motorcycle racing

By season

Races by year

British Superbike Championship

By year

References

External links

Profile on AsiaTalentCup.com

Japanese motorcycle racers
Living people
1998 births
Moto3 World Championship riders
Moto2 World Championship riders
People from Kiryū, Gunma